CF Montréal is a Canadian professional Football club based in Montréal, Québec, Canada. The club competes in Major League Soccer (MLS) in the Eastern Conference. Founded in 1992 as the Montréal Impact, the team began play in the MLS in 2012 as an expansion team, the league's nineteenth franchise and third Canadian club. 

The Impact was the first ever Canadian club, and the second MLS club in history, to advance to the final of the CONCACAF Champions League in 2015 losing to Club América. 

The club rebranded as Club de Foot Montréal in 2021 with a new club crest and colours, however, amidst continued discontent and pressure from supporters and local media, the club introduced a revised logo for the 2023 season, with the club being known simply as CF Montréal.

CF Montréal have won the Voyageurs Cup, the domestic trophy for professional club football in Canada, a total of 11 times. The club plays its home matches at Stade Saputo and Hernán Losada is the current head coach for the club.

History

Founding and pre-MLS era 
Impact de Montréal FC were founded in 1992 when the Saputo family acquired a new franchise in the American Professional Soccer League (APSL), at the time the topflight of professional North American soccer north of the Rio Grande, set to begin competition for the 1993 season.

American Professional Soccer league (APSL) from 1993 to 1994 and A-League from 1995 to 2004

Championships: 1994 and 2004

In 1994, the Impact defeated the Colorado Foxes 1–0 at Centre Claude Robillard in Montréal, in front of a crowd of 8,169. The victory was the first championship for a professional soccer club from the city of Montréal.

In 2004, the Impact defeated the Seattle Sounders 2–0 at Centre Claude Robillard in Montréal, in front of a crowd of 13,648, a new attendance record for the club at the time.

The Impact were regular season champions for three consecutive seasons, from 1995 to 1997.

United Soccer Leagues First Division (usually referred to as USL-1) from 2005 to 2009

In 2005, the A-League was absorbed into the United Soccer Leagues First Division. The Impact started the 2005 season with a 15-game undefeated streak and finished 10 points clear of second place. They were nevertheless knocked out in the semi-finals by the Seattle Sounders.  That same year, the club announced the construction of Stade Saputo. The soccer-specific stadium and the club’s current home opened in May 2008

Championship: 2009

In 2009, the Impact defeated the Vancouver Whitecaps FC 3–1 (6–3 on aggregate) at Stade Saputo in Montréal, in front of a crowd of 13,034.

The Impact were Commissioner's Cup winners (regular season champions) in 2005 and 2006.

USSF Division 2 Professional League (D2 Pro League) in 2010

After the 2009 season, the Impact, along with 8 other clubs, broke away from the USL-1 to become one of the founding members of the new North American Soccer League. However, due to a legal dispute between the USL and new NASL, the United States Soccer Federation (USSF) created a temporary league (the D2 Pro League) for the 2010 season.  The Impact lost in the semi-finals in the only season played in the D2 Pro League.

North American Soccer League (NASL) in 2011

Despite being founded in 2009, the NASL only began play in 2011 due to legal issues. The Impact failed to qualify for the playoffs in their only season in the league.  The Impact joined MLS the following year.

Voyageurs Cup

During their pre-MLS era, the Impact won the first 7 editions of the Voyagers Cup, from 2002 to 2008.

CONCACAF Champions League

The Impact qualified for the 2008–2009 CONCACAF Champions League for the first time in its history by winning the first edition of the Canadian Championships, the only berth allotted to a club from Canada. During group stage, the Impact lost only once to the eventual Champions, Atlante Fútbol Club, in Cancún. After losing 2–0 to the Impact in Montréal, Joe Public FC head coach Keith Griffith publicly predicted his team would easily win the return match on their home turf. "The next time we meet the Impact (in Trinidad and Tobago), we'll beat them by four goals clear, for sure," Griffith said at the time. However, the Impact defeated the Trinidadian club with a 4–1 win in Port of Spain. The Impact finished second in group C and thus advanced to the quarter finals.  The Impact recorded a 2–0 win at Olympic Stadium against Mexican club Santos Laguna in the first leg, in front of an attendance of 55,571. In the second leg, the Impact lead Santos Laguna 2–1 at halftime, forging a 4–1 lead on aggregate in Torreón.  However, in the second half, Santos Laguna scored 4 unanswered goals, including 2 goals in added time thus eliminating the Impact from the competition.

MLS franchise bid and transition

Toward the end of 2007, much speculation had been made about a possible franchise move for the lower division Impact to Major League Soccer (MLS).  The construction of the expandable Saputo Stadium further suggested an interest on the part of the group to move up to the top-level North American league. Although Toronto FC held a three-year Canadian exclusivity deal that did not expire until 2009, they stated in March 2008 that they would gladly welcome the Impact into MLS.

Chairman Joey Saputo held talks with George Gillett (former co-owner of Liverpool F.C. and former owner of the Montreal Canadiens) regarding possible joint ownership of a franchise. On July 24, 2008, MLS announced they were seeking to add two expansion teams for the 2011 season, of which Montreal was listed as a potential candidate.

On November 22, 2008, the group's bid for an MLS franchise was not retained by commissioner Don Garber. In response to Vancouver's successful bid in March 2009, Impact GM Nick De Santis commented that he expected chairman Saputo to pursue and realize his vision of Montreal as an MLS franchise someday. By May 16, 2009, the Montreal Gazette reported Garber and Saputo had resumed talks for an expansion team to begin play in 2011.

On May 7, 2010, Garber and Saputo announced Montreal as the nineteenth club in Major League Soccer, set to begin play for the 2012 season. The MLS franchise is privately owned by the Saputo family.

On June 14, 2011, the Montreal Impact announced a five-year agreement with the Bank of Montreal to become their lead sponsor and jersey sponsor in MLS.

In August 2011, Jesse Marsch became the Impact's new head coach. The club began building their roster for their inaugural MLS season in October 2011 with the signing of defenseman Nelson Rivas, previously of Inter Milan. From their NASL roster, the Impact re-signed defender Hassoun Camara, goalkeeper Evan Bush and midfielder Sinisa Ubiparipovic to new MLS contracts. Through the MLS expansion draft, the Impact were able to select in November 2011 ten more players, most notably midfielder and American international Justin Mapp. The Impact also traded for Davy Arnaud from Sporting Kansas City who would eventually become the team's first MLS captain. In December 2011, the club signed long-time Impact goalkeeper and Canadian international Greg Sutton, midfielder, Canadian international, future team captain and future Canada Soccer hall of famer Patrice Bernier, and Brazilian midfielder Felipe Martins. Veteran forward and long-time Impact player Eduardo Sebrango was invited to training camp and in February 2012 was awarded an MLS contract.

Beginnings in MLS and Champions League Final
2012 season

On March 10, 2012, the Impact played their first MLS game, a 2–0 loss to Vancouver Whitecaps FC. A week later, the club made its home debut at the Olympic Stadium against theChicago Fire, the game ending in a 1–1 draw. The match attracted 58,912 spectators, surpassing the previous record for professional soccer in Montréal established in a 1981 Montreal Manic home game against the Chicago Sting (58,542). On May 12, 2012, the Impact set a new attendance record for a professional soccer match in Canada with a crowd of 60,860 spectators during a game against the Los Angeles Galaxy which ended in 1-1 draw. On May 24, 2012, the club announced the signing of their first ever MLS Designated Player in Marco Di Vaio, previously of Bologna F.C. 1909.  Di Vaio signed with the Impact after 14 seasons in Serie A and went on to score 34 goals in 76 appearances from 2012 to 2014 with the club. The Impact finished the 2012 regular season in seventh place in the Eastern conference with a record of 12 wins, 16 losses, and 6 ties.

2013 season

On February 23, 2013, the Impact won the 2013 Walt Disney World Pro Soccer Classic, beating Columbus Crew 1–0 in the final during their pre-season campaign. On May 29, the club  won the 2013 Canadian Championship by defeating Vancouver Whitecaps FC in the final, the Impact`s first major trophy since joining MLS and their eighth Voyageurs Cup. As Canadian Champions, the Impact earned a spot in the 2014–15 CONCACAF Champions League, their second ever birth and first birth since joinging MLS as an expansion team. The club finished the 2013 MLS regular season with a record of 14 wins, 13 losses, and 7 ties which earned them their first-ever MLS playoff birth, finishing in fifth place in the Eastern Conference. In playoffs, the Impact was eliminated by the Houston Dynamo in the knockout round.

2014 season

The Impact became repeat Voyageurs Cup champions by defeating Toronto FC in the 2014 Canadian Championship final on June 4, 2014. Despite their success in the domestic cup, the Impact struggled in league play. The Impact finished the 2014 MLS season with a record of 6–18–10 (W-L-D), finishing last in the league.

2014 -2015 CONCACAF Champions League run

The Impact were drawn into group 3 with C.D. FAS of El Salvador and MLS rivals New York Red Bulls. With only the winner of each group advancing to the knockout stage, the Impact went undefeated in the group stage with 3 wins and a draw to win the group. 

Quarterfinals

In the quarterfinals, the Impact took an early 2-0 lead against Pachuca in the first leg at Estadio Hidalgo but the Mexican club fought back to draw the game 2-2. Despite the Impact`s inability to hold the lead, the 2 away goals gave the Impact an edge for the return leg. On March 3, 2015, at Olympic Stadium in Montréal, Pachuca took the lead in the 80th minute when referee Walter López awarded a penalty to the Mexican side and Germán Ezequiel Cano Recalde gave his team the lead. However, in the dying seconds of stoppage time, substitute Cameron Porter controlled a long pass from Callum Mallace, fought off a defender and slipped the ball between the legs of Pachuca`s goalkeeper to tie the game thus sending the Impact to the semi-finals on away goals (3-3 aggregate). The Impact became the first Canadian club to win a two-legged series against a Mexican opponent.

Porter`s goal 

Cameron Porter was drafted 45th overall on January 15, 2015, by the Impact in the MLS SuperDraft. He made his professional debut on February 24 of that same year as an 81st-minute substitute against Pachuca in the first leg of the quarterfinals.  His goal in stoppage time (90+4) in the second leg was the first professional goal of his career and his only goal for the Impact. Porter suffered a serious injury to his left knee less than a month later which required surgery to repair a torn ACL. He retired from professional soccer in 2018 at the early age of 24. Porter`s goal immortalised him as a club legend in the minds of Impact supporters despite only ever playing in two MLS games for the club.

Semi-finals

The Impact faced Alajuelense of Costa Rica in the semi-finals who had dispatched D.C. United in the previous round. In the first leg, the Impact defeated the Costa Rican club 2-0 at Olympic Stadium in Montréal in front of a crowd of 33,675. Alajuelense`s failure to score a goal in Montréal would prove to be fatal three weeks later when the teams met again for the return leg in Alajuela. The Impact opened the scoring just before the half to secure that all important away goal. Despite Alajuelense`s two late goals to win the game 4-2, the Impact advanced to the finals on away goals (4-4 on aggregate).

Finals

The Impact became the first Canadian club and only the second MLS club to advance to the CONCACAF Champion`s League finals and would face Club América.  The first leg in Mexico resulted in a 1-1 draw at the Azteca in Mexico City on April 22, 2015.  A week later the teams met again at the Olympic Stadium in Montréal in front of a sold-out crowd of 61,004. The home team scored in the 8th minute when Nacho Piatti moved swiftly past three América players and passed to an open Andrés Romero who slotted the ball past the Mexican goalkeeper. The first half ended with the Impact ahead 1-0 in the game and 2-1 on aggregate.  However, Club América scored four goals in the second half and the game ended 4-2 to América (5-3 on aggregate).

2015–present
In 2015, head coach Frank Klopas was fired in August and replaced on an interim basis by former Impact player Mauro Biello. After qualifying for the playoffs and defeating Toronto FC in the first round before being eliminated in the Conference semi-finals by the Columbus Crew, Biello was hired permanently. The team was also boosted mid-season by the arrival of Ivory Coast forward Didier Drogba, formerly of Chelsea.

Biello was dismissed by the club in October 2017 after failing to qualify for the playoffs and was succeeded by Rémi Garde, formerly of Aston Villa. Garde was himself dismissed in August 2019 and replaced by former Colombian football defender Wilmer Cabrera on an interim basis. During Cabrera's time at the helm of the team, the Impact won the 2019 Canadian Championship defeating Toronto FC in the finals. Despite his success in the Canadian Championship, Cabrera failed to lead the team to the MLS playoffs and his contract was not renewed for the following season.

In November 2019, former France international Thierry Henry signed a two-year deal to coach the Impact. In his first season, the team made the playoffs for the first time since 2016, but were eliminated 2–1 by the New England Revolution in the first round. That same year, the Impact's first Champions League campaign since the 2015 final ended in the quarter-finals, with away goals elimination by Hondurian club C.D. Olimpia.  Henry resigned in February 2021 stating family reasons for his decision to step down as head coach.  In a press release, he said: "The last year has been an extremely difficult one for me personally. Due to the worldwide pandemic, I was unable to see my children. Unfortunately due to the ongoing restrictions and the fact that we will have to relocate to the U.S. again for several months will be no different. The separation is too much of a strain for me and my kids. Therefore, it is with much sadness that I must take the decision to return to London and leave CF Montreal."  Following Henry's abrupt departure, assistant coach Wilfried Nancy was named interim head coach and following an impressive start to his first season, Nancy was made permanent and his contract renewed in May 2021 as head coach for 2022.

CF Montréal finished the 2022 MLS season in second place in the Eastern Conference and third place overall, the club`s highest finish since their inaugural 2012 season in MLS. The club set a total of 8 new club records including for the number of wins in a season (20) and points in a regular season (65). They also set 2 new all-time MLS records for most road wins in a single season (11) and most consecutive road wins (7). CF Montréal were knocked out of the 2022 MLS playoffs in the Eastern Conference Semifinals by New York City FC by a score of 3–1, at Stade Saputo. CF Montréal also set new club records for income earned from the sale of players with the sale of Djordje Mihailovic to AZ Alkmaar, Alistair Johnston to Celtic FC and Ismaël Koné to Watford FC. MLS 2022 Coach of the Year candidate, Wilfried Nancy left the club and signed with Columbus Crew in December 2022 and was replaced with former D.C. United head coach Hernán Losada. It was reported that Nancy had agreed with management to finish the season with CF Montréal following a verbal conflict with club owner, Joey Saputo, after a 3–0 loss to Sporting Kansas City in July but that he would be leaving the club after the end of the season.

Team name and logo
In regards to keeping the name "Impact" upon the move to MLS, Montreal stated its intention "to maintain its name and global team image." The official logo for the team was revealed at the start of a match between the NASL Montreal Impact team and the NSC Minnesota Stars on August 6, 2011.

The previous logo was a shield in blue, black, white and silver containing a stylized fleur-de-lis and four silver stars, overlaid with the Impact wordmark. The fleur-de-lis, which also appeared on the logo of the NASL Impact team, is a globally recognized symbol of French heritage, and features prominently on the flag of Quebec as a reflection of Québécois culture. The four stars represent the four founding communities of Montreal identified on the city's coat of arms. At the top of the shield, the team's motto, "Tous Pour Gagner" (French for "all for victory") is inscribed. In 2020, the Impact unveiled a new slogan, "Passion. Fierté. Authenticité." (Passion. Pride. Authenticity.").

In January 2021, the club rebranded as Club de Foot Montréal (or CF Montreal), with Saputo saying "It's hard to let go of things you love. But here's the reality — to make an impact, we need to retire the Impact." As part of the rebranding, the club unveiled a new badge and colors. The club's new official colours were marketed as "Impact Black", "Ice Gray", and "Sacré Bleu". The new badge predominantly features four letter M's and eight arrows pointing to its centre, the elements combining to resemble a stylised snowflake. Creators stated that the new badge was an homage to the emblems of the 1976 Summer Olympics and Expo 67.

The rebranding was poorly received by large portions of the fanbase, local media, former Impact players and especially the club's main supporter groups, most notably the Ultras who published a letter and a petition requesting the club go back to its previous name. In February 2021, supporters protested the rebranding in front of Saputo Stadium. During the protest, the stadium entrance sign featuring the new badge was vandalized by covering the new badge with black paint. One individual was arrested.

In May 2022, amidst declining ticket sales, continued discontent and pressure from fans and media alike, the club unveiled a new badge and announced that it would take effect for the 2023 season, with the club shortening the name to simply CF Montréal. The new badge features a return to the clubs traditional colours with blue being predominant, and centered around a stylised fleur de lys, which the club has used as a symbol since 2002.

Uniform evolution
Home, away, and alternative uniforms.
Home

Away

Alternative

Club culture

Supporters group

"Ultras Montréal", also known as "UM02", was founded in 2002 and was CF Montréal's largest and oldest supporters group. The group's motto is "Toujours fidèles" in French and translates as "Forever faithful". The Ultras were a highly active group, known for their unwavering 90 minute chants, use of smoke grenades, creating large tifos, waving flags,  and organizing road trips to follow the club on away games. The group was located directly behind the net, on the south side of Stade Saputo, in section 132 with some spillover into section 131. Smaller independent groups are also located in these sections, joining their voices to the Ultras during matches.

In September 2021, the organization announced that it was banning certain supporter groups, most notably, the Ultras Montréal. This move sparked many skeptical reactions as it came on the heels of a feud between the group and then President of the club, Kevin Gilmore. The conflict was a culmination of things that started almost exclusively with the rebranding of the club and abandonment of the highly popular team name, Impact de Montréal. The club cited misconduct and past violent incidents, however no further specifics were given in their press release.

"127 Montréal" was formed in 2011 and are located in the south-west corner of Stade Saputo, in section 127. Although not an official supporters section in the stadium, the club removed several rows of seats at the bottom of section 127 to accommodate the group.  The group can be identified in the stadium by a banner displaying the group's name and crest. The crest features a snowy owl (Nyctea scandiaca), the official bird of the Province of Québec. 127 Montréal would usually join the Ultras in their chants during matches and occasionally join them on away games. Since the banning of UM02, 127 Montréal have continued to use chants popularized by the Ultras during matches, sometimes in coordination with supporters in section 131. The group can also be seen during matches waving flags sporting their logo and using smoke grenades.

Named after the founding year of Montreal, 1642 MTL is a supporters group formed in 2015 and located directly behind the net, on the north side of Saputo Stadium, in section 114. 1642 MTL are the owners and caretakers of the North Star bell. Highly active during matches, the group uses flags extensively, occasionally creates tifos and uses smoke grenades. Prior to the banning of UM02, the two supporters groups at opposing ends of the field, acting independently, created hostile territory for opposing goaltenders during both halves.

On September 6, 2022, the club announced that it would be reopening section 132 to supporter groups, the decision taking immediate effect. A collective of supporters, many of whom were previously active in section 132 prior to its closure in September 2021, have confirmed they will be making the section their home as the "Collectif Impact Montréal".  "Ultras Montréal" released a statement on September 7, 2022, indicating that they are not part of the collective.

Mascot
The official mascot of the club was Tac-Tik the dog.

The North Star

It was inaugurated on October 25, 2015, by Montreal mayor Denis Coderre where it was rung twice in a Montreal Impact victory against Toronto FC. Since then, numerous personalities from the sports, cultural and art worlds, including many famous Montrealers and others linked to the city have been invited to ring the bell. Amongst them, local media personalities Tony Marinaro and Jean-Charles Lajoie, Canadian women's national soccer team players Gabrielle Carle and Josée Bélanger, retired Montréal Expos pitcher Bill "Spaceman" Lee, retired Montreal Canadiens center Andrew Shaw, retired Montréal Alouettes quarterback Anthony Calvillo, mixed martial artist and former UFC champion Georges St-Pierre and many Canadian Olympic medallists.

The North Star is a symbolistic nod to the city's religious heritage. Québec is unique among Canadian provinces in its overwhelmingly Roman Catholic population. Its history steeped in religion, Montréal is nicknamed “The City of a Hundred Steeples” for the many church steeples that dominated the city's skyline prior to the emergence of highrise buildings and skyscrapers. While visiting Montréal in 1881, Mark Twain said; “This is the first time I was ever in a city where you couldn't throw a brick without breaking a church window. Yet I was told that you were going to build one more. I said the scheme is good, but where are you going to find room? They said, we will build it on top of another church and use an elevator.”

Rivalries

CF Montréal's biggest rival is Toronto FC, arguably MLS' fiercest rivalry. Professional soccer clubs from Canada's two largest cities have competed against each other for over 40 years. From the original NASL, the Canadian Soccer League, the A-League until today in the MLS, the rivalry has continued throughout various leagues and in the Canadian Championship. Since both teams have joined the MLS, the rivalry has intensified, culminating in the 2016 MLS Eastern conference finals, arguably the MLS' greatest playoff series. The first leg of the series at Stade Olympique in Montréal holds the record for the largest attendance for a match featuring two Canadian soccer teams with 61,004 fans. The matches between the two clubs have become a Canadian soccer classic which has been nicknamed the Canadian Classique or the 401 Derby, for the 401 highway that links the two cities.

The following table lists the history of official matches in MLS and the Canadian Championship between CF Montréal and Toronto FC.

CF Montréal also shares a minor rivalry with Vancouver Whitecaps FC, which stems from their pre-MLS clubs, most notably in the USL-1 2009 finals when the Impact defeated the Whitecaps 3–1 in Montréal (6–3 on aggregate) to win the league championship on October 17, 2009. The rivalry transported to the MLS after both clubs joined the league and has been sustained mainly through the Canadian Championship, most notably when the clubs faced off in the 2013 finals won by Montréal and the 2015 finals won by Vancouver.

Affiliations

CF Montréal Academy and Reserves

CF Montréal Academy is the club's youth academy and development system, which was established in 2010. The academy consists of various teams, from U8 to U23. From 2010 to 2012, the academy entered a team in the Canadian Soccer League, which replaced their former reserve team Trois-Rivières Attak. In 2014, the U23 team competed in the USL Premier Development League, the fourth tier of the Canadian soccer pyramid. In 2015 and 2016, a reserve team competed in the United Soccer League under the name FC Montreal. Currently, they enter U18 and U16 teams in the U.S. Soccer Development Academy and a U23 team competing in the PLSQ.

Ottawa Fury FC 

The Ottawa Fury FC, of the league then known as the United Soccer League and now as the USL Championship, entered into an affiliation agreement on December 9, 2016. That agreement ended when the Ottawa Fury were dissolved on November 8, 2019, and their USL franchise rights sold to Miami FC the following month.

Stadium

CF Montréal plays its home matches at Saputo Stadium, a soccer-specific stadium with a natural grass playing surface built in 2008 for the then second division Impact de Montréal but designed with expansion in mind with the club anticipating a move to MLS. The Québec government announced $23 million in funding to expand the stadium to more than 20,000 seats as well as build a training field with synthetic turf adjacent to the stadium.

Expansion to Saputo Stadium was expected to be finished in time for the start of the club's inaugural 2012 MLS season, but it was announced on July 17, 2011, that the expansion would be delayed.  As a consequence, the neighbouring Olympic Stadium was used for the Impact's first six home dates (5 MLS regular season, 1 Canadian Championship).  The Impact's first MLS game at Saputo Stadium was eventually played on June 16, 2012, a 4–1 win over Seattle.

Though Saputo Stadium serves as the club's primary home, Olympic Stadium is also used for special events which demand a larger capacity or more favorable playing conditions (e.g. the team's season home opener, playoff matches, international competitions, and under winter conditions).

Home stadium
 Saputo Stadium; Montreal, Quebec (2012–present): capacity 20,801

Other stadiums
 Olympic Stadium, Montreal, Quebec (2012–present): capacity 61,004

Broadcasting
As of the 2023 season, all CF Montreal matches are carried by MLS Season Pass on Apple TV, with all matches available with French, English, and Spanish commentary options. Selected matches will air in French on RDS and in English on TSN.

From its inception through 2022, nearly all CF Montreal matches aired on TVA Sports as the team's regional rightsholder. TVA Sports aired 24 matches during the team's inaugural season, with play by play duties held by Fréderic Lord and colour commentary provided by Vincent Destouches. From the 2017 season, TVA Sports became the French national rightsholder of Major League Soccer, televising all CF Montreal matches, as well as French-language coverage of other matches. The team never sold English-language television rights to its "regional" matches, but Montreal regular-season matches against Canadian opponents were broadcast in English by TSN as part of its rights to MLS (which covered the national package, and separate rights to Toronto FC and Vancouver Whitecaps matches not covered by the national package). 

CHMP 98,5 FM served as the club's French-language radio flagship from 2015 through 2020, with Jeremy Filosa on play-by-play and analyst Arcadio Marcuzzi.  On January 19, 2021, CKLX 91.9 Sports announced that it would become the club's new French-language radio flagship through 2022. CKGM TSN 690 Montreal serves as the English-language radio flagship of the club. Rick Moffat handles play-by-play duties while colour commentary is provided by former Montreal player Grant Needham.

Players and staff

Roster

Out on Loan

Retired numbers

 20 – Mauro Biello, forward (1993–98, 2000–09)

Management

  Joey Saputo – Owner
  Gabriel Gervais – President and Chief Executive Officer
  Olivier Renard – Vice president and Chief Sporting Officer
  Salvatore Rivera – Vice-president & Chief Financial Officer
  Amélie Vaillancourt – Vice-president & Chief Human Resource Officer
  Samia Chebeir – Vice-president and Chief Marketing Officer

Coaching staff

  Hernán Losada – head coach
  Laurent Ciman – assistant coach
  Sebastián Setti – assistant coach
  Eduardo Sebrango – assistant manager
  Hervé Diese – assistant manager
  Romuald Peiser – goalkeeping coach
  Barthélémy Delecroix – fitness Coach
  Stefano Pasquali – assistant fitness Coach
  Louan Schlicht – video Analyst
  Luca Bucci – responsible for the goalkeeping development methodology

Head coach records 

 1.Includes league, playoff, Canadian Championship and CONCACAF Champions League matches.

Honours

National
Canadian Championship
 Winners: 2013, 2014, 2019, 2021
 Runners-up: 2015, 2017

Continental
CONCACAF Champions League
 Runners-up: 2014–15

Friendly
CapCity Cup
 Winners: 2018
Walt Disney World Pro Soccer Classic
 Winners: 2013

Team records

Year-by-year

This is a partial list of the last five seasons completed by CF Montréal. For the full season-by-season history, see List of CF Montréal seasons.

1. Avg. attendance include statistics from league matches only.
2. Top goalscorer(s) includes all goals scored in League, Playoffs, Canadian Championship, MLS is Back Tournament, CONCACAF Champions League, FIFA Club World Cup, and other competitive continental matches.

All-time continental competition win/loss

International results

Player records

Top appearances (MLS regular season matches only) 

Bolded players are currently on the CF Montréal roster.

Top goalscorers (MLS regular season matches only) 

Bolded players are currently on the CF Montréal roster.

Top assists (MLS regular season matches only) 

Bolded players are currently on the CF Montréal roster.

Top wins (MLS regular season matches only) 

Bolded players are currently on the CF Montréal roster.

Top clean sheets (MLS regular season matches only) 

Bolded players are currently on the CF Montréal roster.

Giuseppe Saputo Trophy
The Giuseppe Saputo Trophy is awarded to the club's Most Valuable Player.

Golden Boot
CF Montréal's Golden Boot is awarded to the club's leading goalscorer.

Note: Only MLS regular season goals count.

Defensive player of the year
Awarded to the club's best defender.

Jason Di Tullio Trophy
Awarded in recognition of the player who best embodied the spirit of “La Grinta” throughout the MLS season.

Club captains

Footnotes

References

External links
 

 
Association football clubs established in 1993
Major League Soccer teams based in Canada
Soccer clubs in Quebec
1993 establishments in Quebec
Expatriated football clubs